Patrick Andersson (born 16 July 1970) is a Swedish former footballer who played as a midfielder.

References

Association football midfielders
Swedish footballers
Allsvenskan players
Malmö FF players
1970 births
Living people